Lechuga is a Spanish surname. It is occupational in origin and was used for a grower or seller of lettuces, lechuga being the Spanish word for "lettuce", "salad". Notable people with the surname include:
 Antonio Lechuga (born 1988), Spanish footballer
 Cristobal Lechuga (1557–1622), Spanish military engineer
 Héctor Lechuga (1927–2017), Mexican actor, comedian, political commentarist and radio personality
 José Ignacio Pichardo Lechuga (born 1966), Mexican politician
 Kenia Lechuga (born 1994), Mexican rower
Laura Lechuga, Spanish microbiologist
 Pablo Lechuga (born 1990), Spanish racing cyclist
 Raúl Lucio Hernández Lechuga, former Mexican drug lord
 Ruth D. Lechuga (1920–2004), Austrian-born collector of Mexican folk art
 Scotti Lechuga (born 1983), American former racing cyclist
 Víctor Lechuga (born 1966), Guatemalan former cyclist

References 

Occupational surnames
Spanish-language surnames